Morsang-sur-Orge (literally Morsang on Orge) is a commune in the southern suburbs of Paris, France.

Population

Inhabitants of Morsang-sur-Orge are known as Morsaintois.

Transport
Morsang-sur-Orge is served by no station of the Paris Métro, RER, or suburban rail network. The closest station to Morsang-sur-Orge is Savigny-sur-Orge station, which is approximately a 22-minute train journey from the center of Paris on the Paris RER line . This station is located in the neighboring commune of Savigny-sur-Orge,  from the town center of Morsang-sur-Orge.

See also
Communes of the Essonne department

References

External links

Official website 

Mayors of Essonne Association 

Communes of Essonne